Stanley James Warmington (16 December 1884 – 10 May 1941), or just S. J. Warmington, was an English actor who appeared on film, stage, radio, and television in the early 20th century.

Life and career
Warmington was born in Hertfordshire, England on 16 December 1884. Warmington studied for the stage at the Royal Academy of Dramatic Art after working as a journalist. Beginning in the 1910s he appeared in numerous stage productions in West End theatre in London and Broadway theatre in New York City.
In 1919 Warmington landed his first cinematic role in the silent film Wisp o' the Woods and he went on to play supporting roles, typically a detective or police officer, in some of Alfred Hitchcock’s earliest films including Sabotage, The 39 Steps, The Man Who Knew Too Much, and  Murder!. In the late 1930s Warmington gained national fame for playing the lead role in the BBC radio drama Inspector Hornleigh. In 1939 Warmington also acted in some of the earliest made-for-TV films. In 1934 Warmington married film and stage actress Ms. Victoria Olga Edwine Slade (b. 1891 – d. 1949)

Warmington’s death
S. J. Warmington was killed at the age of 56 during the Second World War when the German Luftwaffe intentionally bombed residential areas in Great Britain. On the evening of 10 May 1941 Warmington was in bed at his home, Number 39, Elvaston Place, in Kensington, London, when his neighbourhood was showered with incendiary bombs. Warmington, a volunteer Fire Guard, went out to help extinguish the resulting fires and was amongst those killed, at Number 22, when a high-explosive bomb fell. The civilian casualties from the bombing campaign lasting more than a year were high, with tens of thousands killed and injured. Warmington's death received a minor mention in The Times.

Filmography
1919: A Smart Set – Herbert Sterne
1919: Wisp o' the Woods – James Whitmore
1920: The Amateur Wife – Randolph Ferguson
1928: A South Sea Bubble – Frank Sullivan
1930: Murder! – Bennett
1930: Escape! – Warder
1931: The Calendar
1932: The Crooked Lady – Inspector Hilton
1934: The Man Who Knew Too Much – Rawlings – Gang Member (uncredited)
1935: The 39 Steps – Scotland Yard Man (uncredited)
1936: Sabotage – Hollingshead
1939: Bees on the Boat-Deck (TV Movie)
1939: The Little Father of the Wilderness (TV Movie) – Captain Chevillon (final film role)

Stage performances 

 March 1920 – King Richard III as Sir William Catesby at Plymouth Theatre in New York.
 February 1920 – Trimmed in Scarlet as Charles Knight at Maxine Elliott's Theatre  in New York.
 October 1914 – My Lady's Dress at the Playhouse Theatre in New York.

References

External links

English male film actors
English male radio actors
English male stage actors
English male television actors
British civilians killed in World War II
1884 births
1941 deaths
Deaths by airstrike during World War II
20th-century English male actors